Estoloides chamelae is a species of beetle in the family Cerambycidae. It was described by Chemsak and Noguera in 1993. It is known from Mexico.

References

Estoloides
Beetles described in 1993